Scorzonera tau-saghyz is a species of Scorzonera, in the family Asteraceae.

It is endemic to Tajikistan, Uzbekistan and Karatau Mountains of Kazakhstan in Central Asia.

Uses
It is of interest as a source of latex suitable for making natural rubber, with latex (in old specimens on average 20%) contained in large roots and underground stems extending from them. The Soviet Union cultivated Scorzonera tau-saghyz, together with Taraxacum hybernum and Taraxacum kok-saghyz, on a large scale between 1931 and 1950—notably during World War II—as an emergency source of rubber when supplies of rubber from Hevea brasiliensis in Southeast Asia were threatened.

References

Cichorieae
Flora of Tajikistan
Flora of Uzbekistan
Flora of Kazakhstan
Rubber
Plants described in 1931